Mando refers to:

Mandø, one of the Danish Wadden Sea islands
Mando (singer), a Greek singer
Mando (music), a Goan (Indian) musical form
Mando Diao, Swedish garage rock band.
Mando Corporation, a Korean automotive parts manufacturer
Mando Fresko, American radio personality (Power 106 FM), TV host, actor and club DJ
Mandolin, in colloquial English
Mandopop, popular music in Mandarin Chinese
Mandarin Chinese, the official language of China, Taiwan and Singapore; or all people who speak Mandarin as a group
The Mandalorian (character), eponymous character from the Star Wars series

People
Abdullah Mando, Syrian footballer
Fawaz Mando, Syrian footballer
Iyad Mando, Syrian footballer
Michael Mando, Canadian film and television actor